The 2014 Davidson Wildcats football team represented Davidson College in the 2014 NCAA Division I FCS football season. They were led by second-year head coach Paul Nichols and played their home games at Richardson Stadium. They were a member of the Pioneer Football League. They finished the season 1–11, 0–8 in PFL play to finish in last place.

Schedule

Source: Schedule

References

Davidson
Davidson Wildcats football seasons
Davidson Wildcats football